Ma'am May We Go Out? is a 1985 Filipino comedy film written and directed by Mike Relon Makiling. It stars comedic trio Tito Sotto, Vic Sotto and Joey de Leon.

Plot 
Soriano brothers Dennis, Chipipoy/Chip, and Jeff are bums who do odd jobs to earn a living, including driving a jeepney. Their lives take a different turn after meeting Atty. Aga Agaton, who told them that they are long-lost heirs of a US-based millionaire. Per the millionaire's will, the brothers would claim his inheritance as long as they finish high school or else the lawyer will take it all.

The brothers enroll at the Rajah Putih High School where their age turns them into the butt of their classmates' jokes. The brothers eventually befriend a group of students after saving them from thugs. They also seek help from Einstein, the class' resident genius, in order to get away with the most difficult subjects.
 
Trouble starts when the Soriano brothers become involved in different mishaps happening in the school (including inviting prostitutes to a general parent-teachers assembly, almost burning the school during the foundation day, and getting Chip a prom date who turned out to be a striptease dancer), resulting in multiple confrontations with the school principal, with each confrontation causing her to weaken. However, despite compromises that eventually lead to more shenanigans & their great ideas for programs that earned the school more money, the brothers are set to graduate high school and get the inheritance.

However, Agaton wants the money for himself, plotting with his bodyguard to bomb the Soriano brothers' graduation. At the ceremonies, the brothers were accorded special honors by the school despite having caused much havoc. As a sign of gratitude, Dennis, Chip and Jeff share the special award with Agaton. The lawyer hesitantly accepts the trophy, but the driver warns him too late that the bomb was inside the trophy. Agaton and the driver die, while the Soriano brothers and everyone else on stage are sprawled all over the place.

Cast
Tito Sotto as Dennis Soriano
Vic Sotto as Chipipoy "Chip" Soriano
Joey de Leon as Jeff Soriano
JC Bonnin as Jake
Herbert Bautista as John
Ramon Christopher as Monching 
Niño Muhlach as Angelo Einstein
Cecille Iñigo
Jobelle Salvador
Cheska Iñigo
Carmi Martin as Didi
Roy Alvarez as Mr. Dela Pena
Joonee Gamboa as Assistant Principal De Sahagon
Rustica Carpio as Principal Quirina Landicho
Rodolfo Boy Garcia as Atty. Aga Agaton
Grace Gonzales as Steele
Becky Misa as Miss Lakambini Fundador

External links

References

1985 films
1985 comedy films
Philippine comedy films
Viva Films films
APT Entertainment films
Films directed by Mike Relon Makiling